The 2015–16 Toronto Raptors season was the 21st season of the franchise in the National Basketball Association (NBA). This season marked the Raptors' first 50-win season since their inception in the league, a franchise-best, besting their record (49–33) of the previous season. On May 1, 2016, the Raptors defeated the Indiana Pacers in Game 7 of the first round of the NBA playoffs. This was the second playoff victory in Raptors franchise history, and the first in a seven-game series. In the semifinals, the Raptors survived the third-seeded Miami Heat in a tough seven-game series, marking the first time the team advanced to the Eastern Conference Finals. However, they lost to the Cleveland Cavaliers, the eventual NBA champions, in six games.

Draft

Roster

All-Star Game
The Raptors were the hosts for the NBA All-Star game in 2016.  Kyle Lowry was selected by fan voting to the starting back court for the game, and DeMar DeRozan was also chosen to play in the game as a bench player.

Standings

Preseason

|-style="background:#bfb;"
|1
|October 4
|L. A. Clippers
|93–73
|Kyle Lowry (26)
|Jonas Valančiūnas (12)
|Carroll, DeRozan, Lowry, Ross (2)
|Rogers Arena19,000
|1–0
|-style="background:#fbb;"
|2
|October 5
|@ Golden State
|87–95
|DeMarre Carroll (15)
|Jonas Valančiūnas (10)
|DeMar DeRozan (4)
|SAP Center18,223
|1–1
|-style="background:#bfb;"
|3
|October 8
|@ L. A. Lakers
|105–97
|Kyle Lowry (25)
|Luis Scola (7)
|Kyle Lowry (6)
|Citizens Business Bank Arena8,123
|2–1
|- style="background:#bfb;"
|4
|October 12
|Minnesota
|112–105
|Kyle Lowry (40)
|DeMarre Carroll (8)
|Cory Joseph (4)
|Air Canada Centre19,277
|3–1
|-style="background:#fbb;"
|5
|October 14
|@ Minnesota
|87–89
|Johnson, Wright (11)
|Anthony Bennett (8)
|Joseph, Wright (3)
|Canadian Tire Centre15,522
| 3–2
|-style="background-color:#bfb;"
|6
|October 18
|Cleveland
|87–81
|Jonas Valančiūnas (12)
|Bismack Biyombo (10)
|Kyle Lowry (8)
|Air Canada Centre19,800
|4–2
|-style="background:#bfb;"
|7
|October 23
|Washington
|92–82
|DeMarre Carroll (16)
|Bismack Biyombo (13)
|Kyle Lowry (6)
|Bell Centre20,072
|5–2

Regular season standings

Record vs opponents

(* game decided in overtime)

Regular season

|- style="background:#bfb;"
| 1
| October 28
| Indiana
| 
| DeMar DeRozan (25)
| Jonas Valančiūnas (15)
| Lowry, DeRozan (6)
| Air Canada Centre19,800
| 1–0
|-style="background:#bfb;"
| 2
| October 30
| @ Boston
| 
| DeMar DeRozan (23)
| Jonas Valančiūnas (10)
| Kyle Lowry (9)
| TD Garden16,898
| 2–0

|-style="background:#bfb;"
| 3
| November 1
| Milwaukee
| 
| Jonas Valančiūnas (19)
| Bismack Biyombo (10)
| Kyle Lowry (7)
| Air Canada Centre19,800
| 3–0
|-style="background:#bfb;"
| 4
| November 3
| @ Dallas
| 
| Kyle Lowry (27)
| Luis Scola (12)
| Kyle Lowry (10)
| American Airlines Center20,034
| 4–0
|- style="background:#bfb;"
| 5
| November 4
| @ Oklahoma City
| 
| DeMar DeRozan (28)
| Jonas Valančiūnas (11)
| DeRozan, Joseph, Patterson (3)
| Chesapeake Energy Arena18,203
| 5–0
|- style="background:#fbb;"
| 6
| November 6
| @ Orlando
| 
| DeMar DeRozan (23)
| Jonas Valančiūnas (14)
| Luis Scola (5)
| Amway Center16,578
| 5–1
|- style="background:#fbb;"
| 7
| November 8
| @ Miami
| 
| Jonas Valančiūnas (17)
| Biyombo, Johnson (7)
| Kyle Lowry (8)
| American Airlines Arena19,600
| 5–2
|- style="background:#fbb;"
| 8
| November 10
| New York
| 
| DeMar DeRozan (29)
| Jonas Valančiūnas (9)
| Kyle Lowry (9)
| Air Canada Centre19,800
| 5–3
|- style="background:#bfb;"
| 9
| November 11
| @ Philadelphia
| 
| Luis Scola (21)
| Jonas Valančiūnas (12)
| Kyle Lowry (8)
| Wells Fargo Center12,744
| 6–3
|- style="background:#bfb;"
| 10
| November 13
| New Orleans
| 
| Valančiūnas, Lowry (20)
| Jonas Valančiūnas (10)
| DeMar DeRozan (13)
| Air Canada Centre19,800
| 7–3
|- style="background:#fbb;"
| 11
| November 15
| @ Sacramento
| 
| DeMar DeRozan (24)
| Bismack Biyombo (6)
| Kyle Lowry (7)
| Sleep Train Arena17,006
| 7–4
|- style="background:#fbb;"
| 12
| November 17
| @ Golden State
| 
| DeRozan, Kyle Lowry (28)
| Jonas Valančiūnas (11)
| DeRozan, Joseph (6)
| Oracle Arena19,596
| 7–5
|- style="background:#fbb;"
| 13
| November 18
| @ Utah
| 
| Luis Scola (22)
| Jonas Valančiūnas (9)
| DeRozan, Lowry (6)
| Vivint Smart Home Arena18,741
| 7–6
|- style="background:#bfb;"
| 14
| November 20
| @ L.A. Lakers
| 
| Kyle Lowry (25)
| Carroll, Patterson (7)
| Cory Joseph (6)
| Staples Center18,997
| 8–6
|- style="background:#bfb;"
| 15
| November 22
| @ L.A. Clippers
| 
| Carroll, DeRozan (21)
| Bismack Biyombo (14)
| Kyle Lowry (10)
| Staples Center19,060
| 9–6
|- style="background:#bfb;"
| 16
| November 25
| Cleveland
| 
| Kyle Lowry (27)
| Bismack Biyombo (14)
| Kyle Lowry (6)
| Air Canada Centre20,140
| 10–6
|- style="background:#bfb;"
| 17
| November 28
| @ Washington
| 
| Kyle Lowry (27)
| Bismack Biyombo (16)
| Cory Joseph (6)
| Verizon Center16,841
| 11–6
|- style="background:#fbb;"
| 18
| November 29
| Phoenix
| 
| DeMar DeRozan (29)
| Biyombo, Lowry (8)
| DeMar DeRozan (7)
| Air Canada Centre19,800
| 11–7

|- style="background:#bfb;"
| 19
| December 2
| @ Atlanta
| 
| Kyle Lowry (31)
| Luis Scola (9)
| Kyle Lowry (5)
| Philips Arena12,559
| 12–7
|- style="background:#fbb;"
| 20
| December 3
| Denver
| 
| DeMar DeRozan (34)
| Bismack Biyombo (7)
| Kyle Lowry (8)
| Air Canada Centre19,800
| 12–8
|- style="background:#fbb;"
| 21
| December 5
| Golden State
| 
| Kyle Lowry (41)
| Patrick Patterson (10)
| Kyle Lowry (7)
| Air Canada Centre20,160
| 12–9
|-style="background:#bfb;"
| 22
| December 7
| L.A. Lakers
| 
| Kyle Lowry (26)
| Bismack Biyombo (13)
| DeRozan, Lowry (6)
| Air Canada Centre20,163
| 13–9
|-style="background:#bfb;"
| 23
| December 9
| San Antonio
| 
| DeMar DeRozan (28)
| Luis Scola (8)
| Kyle Lowry (8)
| Air Canada Centre19,800
| 14–9
|-style="background:#bfb;"
| 24
| December 11
| Milwaukee
| 
| DeMar DeRozan (27)
| Luis Scola (8)
| Kyle Lowry (5)
| Air Canada Centre19,800
| 15–9
|-style="background:#bfb;"
| 25
| December 13
| Philadelphia
| 
| DeMar DeRozan (25)
| Bismack Biyombo (9)
| Cory Joseph (4)
| Air Canada Centre19,800
| 16–9
|-style="background:#fbb;"
| 26
| December 14
| @ Indiana
| 
| DeRozan, Lowry (20)
| Bismack Biyombo (13)
| Kyle Lowry (4)
| Bankers Life Fieldhouse16,598
| 16–10
|-style="background:#fbb;"
| 27
| December 17
| @ Charlotte
| 
| DeMar DeRozan (31)
| Bismack Biyombo (18)
| Kyle Lowry (7)
| Time Warner Cable Arena15,817
| 16–11
|-style="background:#bfb;"
| 28
| December 18
| @ Miami
| 
| DeMar DeRozan (30)
| Bismack Biyombo (15)
| James Johnson (5)
| American Airlines Arena19,600
| 17–11
|-style="background:#fbb;"
| 29
| December 20
| Sacramento
| 
| DeMar DeRozan (28)
| Bismack Biyombo (13)
| Kyle Lowry (4)
| Air Canada Centre19,800
| 17–12
|-style="background:#bfb;"
| 30
| December 22
| Dallas
| 
| DeMar DeRozan (28)
| Bismack Biyombo (20)
| Kyle Lowry (7)
| Air Canada Centre19,800
| 18–12
|-style="background:#bfb;"
| 31
| December 26
| @ Milwaukee
| 
| DeMar DeRozan (22)
| Bismack Biyombo (12)
| Kyle Lowry (9)
| BMO Harris Bradley Center16,329
| 19–12
|-style="background:#fbb;"
| 32
| December 28
| @ Chicago
| 
| Kyle Lowry (28)
| Bismack Biyombo (9)
| Kyle Lowry (9)
| United Center21,898
| 19–13
|-style="background:#bfb;"
| 33
| December 30
| Washington
| 
| DeMar DeRozan (34)
| Bismack Biyombo (12)
| Kyle Lowry (6)
| Air Canada Centre19,800
| 20–13

|-style="background:#bfb;"
| 34
| January 1
| Charlotte
| 
| DeMar DeRozan (23)
| Jonas Valančiūnas (13)
| Kyle Lowry (6)
| Air Canada Centre19,800
| 21–13
|-style="background:#fbb;"
| 35
| January 3
| Chicago
| 
| DeMar DeRozan (24)
| Jonas Valančiūnas (9)
| Kyle Lowry (10)
| Air Canada Centre19,800
| 21–14
|-style="background:#fbb;"
| 36
| January 4
| @ Cleveland
| 
| Kyle Lowry (23)
| Jonas Valančiūnas (8)
| Kyle Lowry (10)
| Quicken Loans Arena20,562
| 21–15
|-style="background:#bfb;"
| 37
| January 6
| @ Brooklyn
| 
| Jonas Valančiūnas (22)
| Jonas Valančiūnas (11)
| Kyle Lowry (6)
| Barclays Center14,544
| 22–15
|-style="background:#bfb;"
| 38
| January 8
| @ Washington
| 
| DeMar DeRozan (35)
| Kyle Lowry (10)
| Kyle Lowry (4)
| Verizon Center17,064
| 23–15
|-style="background:#bfb;"
| 39
| January 9
| @ Philadelphia
| 
| Kyle Lowry (25)
| Jonas Valančiūnas (9)
| DeRozan, Lowry (5)
| Wells Fargo Center14,100
| 24–15
|-style="background:#bfb;"
| 40
| January 14
| @ Orlando
| 
| Kyle Lowry (24)
| DeMar DeRozan (11)
| Kyle Lowry (7)
| The O2 Arena (London, England)18,689
| 25–15
|-style="background:#bfb;"
| 41
| January 18
| Brooklyn
| 
| Kyle Lowry (31)
| Jonas Valančiūnas (12)
| Kyle Lowry (8)
| Air Canada Centre19,800
| 26–15
|-style="background:#bfb;"
| 42
| January 20
| Boston
| 
| DeMar DeRozan (34)
| Jonas Valančiūnas (12)
| Kyle Lowry (8)
| Air Canada Centre19,800
| 27–15
|-style="background:#bfb;"
| 43
| January 22
| Miami
| 
| DeMar DeRozan (33)
| Jonas Valančiūnas (12)
| Kyle Lowry (6)
| Air Canada Centre19,800
| 28–15
|-style="background:#bfb;"
| 44
| January 24
| LA Clippers
| 
| Kyle Lowry (21)
| Bismack Biyombo (9)
| Kyle Lowry (6)
| Air Canada Centre19,800
| 29–15
|-style="background:#bfb;"
| 45
| January 26
| Washington
| 
| Kyle Lowry (29)
| Jonas Valančiūnas (12)
| Cory Joseph (6)
| Air Canada Centre19,800
| 30–15
|-style="background:#bfb;"
| 46
| January 28
| New York
| 
| DeRozan, Lowry (26)
| Jonas Valančiūnas (18)
| Kyle Lowry (10)
| Air Canada Centre19,800
| 31–15
|-style="background:#bfb;"
| 47
| January 30
| Detroit
| 
| DeMar DeRozan (29)
| Bismack Biyombo (13)
| DeRozan, Joseph (4)
| Air Canada Centre19,800
| 32–15

|-style="background:#fbb;"
| 48
| February 1
| @ Denver
| 
| DeMar DeRozan (24)
| Jonas Valančiūnas (8)
| DeMar DeRozan (4)
| Pepsi Center10,007
| 32–16
|-style="background:#bfb;"
| 49
| February 2
| @ Phoenix
| 
| Kyle Lowry (26)
| Bismack Biyombo (12)
| Joseph, Lowry (4)
| Talking Stick Resort Arena15,897
| 33–16
|-style="background:#bfb;"
| 50
| February 4
| @ Portland
| 
| Kyle Lowry (30)
| Jonas Valančiūnas (11)
| Kyle Lowry (8)
| Moda Center19,393
| 34–16
|-style="background:#bfb;"
| 51
| February 8
| @ Detroit
| 
| Kyle Lowry (25)
| Jonas Valančiūnas (8)
| Kyle Lowry (7)
| The Palace of Auburn Hills14,103
| 35–16
|-style="background:#fbb;"
| 52
| February 10
| @ Minnesota
| 
| DeMar DeRozan (35)
| Jonas Valančiūnas (7)
| Kyle Lowry (7)
| Target Center11,171
| 35–17
|- align="center"
|colspan="9" bgcolor="#bbcaff"|All-Star Break
|-style="background:#fbb;"
| 53
| February 19
| @ Chicago
| 
| Kyle Lowry (27)
| Jonas Valančiūnas (12)
| Kyle Lowry (8)
| United Center21,849
| 35–18
|- style="background:#bfb;"
| 54
| February 21
| Memphis
| 
| DeMar DeRozan (21)
| Jonas Valančiūnas (13)
| Kyle Lowry (7)
| Air Canada Centre19,800
| 36–18
|- style="background:#bfb;"
| 55
| February 22
| @ New York
| 
| DeRozan, Lowry (22)
| Kyle Lowry (11)
| Kyle Lowry (11)
| Madison Square Garden19,812
| 37–18
|- style="background:#bfb;"
| 56
| February 24
| Minnesota
| 
| DeMar DeRozan (31)
| Bismack Biyombo (11)
| Kyle Lowry (6)
| Air Canada Centre19,800
| 38–18
|- style="background:#bfb;"
| 57
| February 26
| Cleveland
| 
| Kyle Lowry (43)
| Jonas Valančiūnas (9)
| Kyle Lowry (9)
| Air Canada Centre19,800
| 39–18
|- style="background:#fbb;"
| 58
| February 28
| @ Detroit
| 
| Terrence Ross (27)
| Bismack Biyombo (7)
| DeMar DeRozan (7)
| The Palace of Auburn Hills17,201
| 39–19

|- style="background:#bfb;"
| 59
| March 2
| Utah
| 
| Kyle Lowry (32)
| Jonas Valančiūnas (8)
| Kyle Lowry (5)
| Air Canada Centre19,800
| 40–19
|- style="background:#bfb;"
| 60
| March 4
| Portland
| 
| DeMar DeRozan (38)
| Jonas Valančiūnas (10)
| Kyle Lowry (6)
| Air Canada Centre19,800
| 41–19
|- style="background:#fbb;"
| 61
| March 6
| Houston
| 
| Luis Scola (21)
| Jonas Valančiūnas (10)
| Kyle Lowry (9)
| Air Canada Centre19,800
| 41–20
|- style="background:#bfb;"
| 62
| March 8
| Brooklyn
| 
| DeMar DeRozan (25)
| Bismack Biyombo (10)
| Kyle Lowry (9)
| Air Canada Centre19,800
| 42–20
|- style="background:#bfb;"
| 63
| March 10
| Atlanta
| 
| DeMar DeRozan (30)
| Luis Scola (12)
| Kyle Lowry (7)
| Air Canada Centre19,800
| 43–20
|- style="background:#bfb;"
| 64
| March 12
| Miami
| 
| DeMar DeRozan (38)
| DeRozan, Valančiūnas (10)
| DeMar DeRozan (7)
| Air Canada Centre19,800
| 44–20
|- style="background:#fbb;"
| 65
| March 14
| Chicago
| 
| Kyle Lowry (33)
| Kyle Lowry (11)
| Kyle Lowry (7)
| Air Canada Centre19,800
| 44–21
|- style="background:#bfb;"
| 66
| March 15
| @ Milwaukee
| 
| Kyle Lowry (25)
| Bismack Biyombo (13)
| Kyle Lowry (11)
| BMO Harris Bradley Center13,522
| 45–21
|- style="background:#bfb;"
| 67
| March 17
| @ Indiana
| 
| DeRozan, Lowry (28)
| Bismack Biyombo (25)
| Kyle Lowry (4)
| Bankers Life Fieldhouse15,104
| 46–21
|- style="background:#bfb;"
| 68
| March 18
| Boston
| 
| Kyle Lowry (32)
| Bismack Biyombo (11)
| DeMar DeRozan (6)
| Air Canada Centre19,800
| 47–21
|- style="background:#bfb;"
| 69
| March 20
| Orlando
| 
| DeMar DeRozan (25)
| Bismack Biyombo (11)
| Kyle Lowry (7)
| Air Canada Centre19.800
| 48–21
|- style="background:#fbb;"
| 70
| March 23
| @ Boston
| 
| DeMar DeRozan (21)
| Bismack Biyombo (13)
| Cory Joseph (4)
| TD Garden18,624
| 48–22
|- style="background:#fbb;"
| 71
| March 25
| @ Houston
| 
| DeMar DeRozan (18)
| Jonas Valančiūnas (18)
| Kyle Lowry (8)
| Toyota Center18,230
| 48–23
|- style="background:#bfb;"
| 72
| March 26
| @ New Orleans
| 
| DeMar DeRozan (23)
| Jonas Valančiūnas (9)
| Kyle Lowry (8)
| Smoothie King Center17,009
| 49–23
|- style="background:#fbb;"
| 73
| March 28
| Oklahoma City
| 
| DeMar DeRozan (19)
| Jonas Valančiūnas (10)
| DeMar DeRozan (5)
| Air Canada Centre19,800
| 49–24
|- style="background:#bfb;"
| 74
| March 30
| Atlanta
| 
| DeMar DeRozan (26)
| Jonas Valančiūnas (9)
| Kyle Lowry (11)
| Air Canada Centre19,800
| 50–24

|- style="background:#bfb;"
| 75
| April 1
| @ Memphis
| 
| DeMar DeRozan (27)
| Jonas Valančiūnas (14)
| Norman Powell (5)
| FedExForum17,077
| 51–24
|- style="background:#fbb;"
| 76
| April 2
| @ San Antonio
| 
| Norman Powell (17)
| Patrick Patterson (7)
| Cory Joseph (7)
| AT&T Center18,418
| 51–25
|- style="background:#bfb;"
| 77
| April 5
| Charlotte
| 
| DeMar DeRozan (26)
| Jonas Valančiūnas (12)
| Kyle Lowry (6)
| Air Canada Centre19,800
| 52–25
|- style="background:#fbb;"
| 78
| April 7
| @ Atlanta
| 
| DeRozan, Lowry (16)
| Bismack Biyombo (9)
| Kyle Lowry (6)
| Philips Arena17,864
| 52–26
|- style="background:#bfb;"
| 79
| April 8
| Indiana
| 
| Norman Powell (27)
| Jason Thompson (6)
| Cory Joseph (9)
| Air Canada Centre19,800
| 53–26
|- style="background:#bfb;"
| 80
| April 10
| @ New York
| 
| DeMar DeRozan (27)
| Bismack Biyombo (8)
| Kyle Lowry (7)
| Madison Square Garden19,812
| 54–26
|- style="background:#bfb;"
| 81
| April 12
| Philadelphia
| 
| Norman Powell (18)
| Jonas Valančiūnas (11)
| DeMar DeRozan (6)
| Air Canada Centre19,800
| 55–26
|- style="background:#bfb;"
| 82
| April 13
| @ Brooklyn
| 
| Norman Powell (30)
| Terrence Ross (10)
| Delon Wright (7)
| Barclays Center16,517
| 56–26

Playoffs

Game log

|- style="background:#fbb;"
| 1
| April 16
| Indiana
| 
| Cory Joseph (18)
| Jonas Valančiūnas (19)
| Kyle Lowry (7)
| Air Canada Centre19,800
| 0–1
|- style="background:#bfb;"
| 2
| April 18
| Indiana
| 
| Jonas Valančiūnas (23)
| Jonas Valančiūnas (15)
| Kyle Lowry (9)
| Air Canada Centre19,800
| 1–1
|- style="background:#bfb;"
| 3
| April 21
| @ Indiana
| 
| DeRozan, Lowry (21)
| Jonas Valančiūnas (14)
| Kyle Lowry (8)
| Bankers Life Fieldhouse18,165
| 2–1
|- style="background:#fbb;"
| 4
| April 23
| @ Indiana
| 
| Jonas Valančiūnas (16)
| Bismack Biyombo (9)
| Kyle Lowry (5)
| Bankers Life Fieldhouse18,165
| 2–2
|- style="background:#bfb;"
| 5
| April 26
| Indiana
| 
| DeMar DeRozan (34)
| Bismack Biyombo (16)
| Kyle Lowry (5)
| Air Canada Centre19,800
| 3–2
|- style="background:#fbb;"
| 6
| April 29
| @ Indiana
| 
| Carroll, Lowry (15)
| Bismack Biyombo (10)
| Kyle Lowry (10)
| Bankers Life Fieldhouse18,165
| 3–3
|- style="background:#bfb;"
| 7
| May 1
| Indiana
| 
| DeMar DeRozan, (30)
| Jonas Valančiūnas (15)
| Kyle Lowry (9)
| Air Canada Centre20,669
| 4–3

|- style="background:#fbb;"
| 1
| May 3
| Miami
| 
| Jonas Valančiūnas (24)
| Jonas Valančiūnas (14)
| Kyle Lowry (6)
| Air Canada Centre19,800
| 0–1
|- style="background:#bfb;"
| 2
| May 5
| Miami
| 
| DeMarre Carroll (21)
| Jonas Valančiūnas (12)
| Kyle Lowry (6)
| Air Canada Centre20,906
| 1–1
|- style="background:#bfb;"
| 3
| May 7
| @ Miami
| 
| Kyle Lowry (33)
| Jonas Valančiūnas (12)
| DeMar DeRozan (5)
| American Airlines Arena19,675
| 2–1
|- style="background:#fbb;"
| 4
| May 9
| @ Miami
| 
| Joseph, Ross (14)
| Bismack Biyombo (13)
| Kyle Lowry (9)
| American Airlines Arena19,600
| 2–2
|- style="background:#bfb;"
| 5
| May 11
| Miami
| 
| DeMar DeRozan (34)
| Kyle Lowry (10)
| Kyle Lowry (6)
| Air Canada Centre20,155
| 3–2
|- style="background:#fbb;"
| 6
| May 13
| @ Miami
| 
| Kyle Lowry (36)
| Bismack Biyombo (13)
| Kyle Lowry (3)
| American Airlines Arena15,797
| 3–3
|- style="background:#bfb;"
| 7
| May 15
| Miami
| 
| Kyle Lowry (35)
| Bismack Biyombo (16)
| Kyle Lowry (9)
| Air Canada Centre20,257
| 4–3

|- style="background:#fbb;"
| 1
| May 17
| @ Cleveland
| 
| DeMar DeRozan (18)
| Biyombo, Johnson, Lowry (4)
| DeRozan, Lowry (5)
| Quicken Loans Arena20,562
| 0–1
|- style="background:#fbb;"
| 2
| May 19
| @ Cleveland
| 
| DeMar DeRozan (22)
| Kyle Lowry (6)
| Patrick Patterson (4)
| Quicken Loans Arena20,562
| 0–2
|-style="background:#bfb;"
| 3
| May 21
| Cleveland
| 
| DeMar DeRozan (32)
| Bismack Biyombo (26)
| DeMar DeRozan (4)
| Air Canada Centre20,207
| 1–2
|-style="background:#bfb;"
| 4
| May 23
| Cleveland
| 
| Kyle Lowry (35)
| Bismack Biyombo (14)
| Kyle Lowry (5)
| Air Canada Centre20,367
| 2–2
|-style="background:#fbb;"
| 5
| May 25
| @ Cleveland
| 
| DeMar DeRozan (14)
| Jason Thompson (5)
| Kyle Lowry (6)
| Quicken Loans Arena20,526
| 2–3
|-style="background:#fbb;"
| 6
| May 27
| Cleveland
| 
| Kyle Lowry (35)
| Bismack Biyombo (9)
| DeRozan, Lowry (3)
| Air Canada Centre20,605
| 2–4

Transactions

Overview

Trades

Free agents

Additions

Subtractions

References

Toronto Raptors seasons
Toronto Raptors
Toronto Raptors
Toronto Raptors
Tor